First Nashville Guitar Quartet is the title of a recording by Chet Atkins, Liona Boyd, John Knowles and John Pell.

The quartet played in the style of a chamber orchestra for guitars. Arrangements were worked out amongst the four players. Recording was done in both RCA's Studio A and at Atkins' own home studio.

The single "Love Song of Pepe Sanchez", released by the Quartet in 1979, did not chart.

Reception

Writing for Allmusic, critic Richard S.  Ginell wrote of the album "Guitars may not be about to replace violins, violas, and cellos in the chamber music category, but this group proves that they can assume a respectable place in country-pop music, anyway."

Reissues
 In 1997, The First Nashville Guitar Quartet was reissued on CD along with Me and My Guitar in by One Way Records.
 In 2007, it was also released on CD along with The Night Atlanta Burned by Raven Records.

Track listing

Side one
 "Carolina Shout" (Johnson, John Knowles, John Pell) – 2:37
 "Londonderry Air" (Traditional) – 3:00
 "Love Song of Pepe Sanchez" (John Pell) – 2:16
 "Skirts of Mexico" (Ponce, John Knowles) – 3:00
 "You Needed Me" (Goodrum) – 2:59
 "Bound for Boston" (Traditional) – 3:40

Side two
 "Washington Post March" (Traditional) – 2:18
 "Someday My Prince Will Come" (Frank Churchill, Larry Morey) – 2:55
 "Rings of Grass" (Shel Silverstein) – 3:17
 "Rodrigo Concerto" (Joaquín Rodrigo) – 3:34
 "Brandenburg" (Bach) – 2:59

Personnel
Chet Atkins – guitar
Liona Boyd - guitar
John Knowles - guitar
John Pell - guitar

References

1979 albums
Chet Atkins albums
Albums produced by Chet Atkins
RCA Records albums